Khanom farang kudi chin is a Thai-style cake that was influenced by Portuguese desserts since the Ayutthaya era, during the reign of King Narai (1633–88).  Ayutthaya was a trading entrepot and had diplomatic relations with many European countries at the time, such as France, Spain, Holland and Portugal

After the fall of Ayutthaya and during the reign of King Taksin (1767–82), people migrated from the former capital to the new one located on Chao Phraya's west bank (now Thonburi), which included a number of Portuguese people. They were allowed to settle there by the king and intermarry with the Thais. Their descendants are now the Thai-Portuguese at the current Kudi Chin community. To this day, they have inherited legacies from their ancestors, such as Christianity and some western traditions.

This type of cake is a mixture of Portuguese and Chinese cakes. It is topped with raisins, dried sweet gourds and white sugar without using any baking powder or yeast.

Currently, only three families in Thailand produce this type of cake. It is considered a unique dessert of the Kudi Chin community, but it has now been widely distributed to many other places such as Bang Lamphu or Wang Lang Market.

See also
Portugal–Thailand relations
Thai dessert
Maria Guyomar de Pinha
Kudi Chin
Thong yip
Thong yod
Foi thong
Khanom mo kaeng

References

External links

Thai desserts and snacks
Cakes
Portuguese diaspora in Thailand
Portuguese fusion cuisine